Realme 5 Pro is a smartphone from the Chinese company realme.

Specifications

Hardware
The Realme 5 Pro is powered by the Qualcomm Snapdragon 712 AIE octa-core processor (2×2.3 GHz Kryo 360 Gold & 6×1.7 GHz Kryo 360 Silver) and the Adreno 616 GPU.

The battery is 4,035 mAh; a 20W (5V/4A) VOOC 3.0 fast charger is included in the box.

The device has 4, 6 or 8 GB of RAM with 64 GB or 128 GB of internal storage.

Camera
Realme 5 Pro has four rear cameras, the primary camera is a 48MP sensor, and it can record 4K video. The second camera is an 8MP sensor with ultrawide viewing angle. The other two sensors are 2MP: one sensor aids in capturing macro images, while the other assists in capturing portrait images. Both have an aperture of f/2.0 and can record Full HD video.

Software 
The Realme 5 Pro runs ColorOS 6, with features like Game Assist, Game Space, Smart Driving modes and Clone Apps. The software also includes DRM L1 certification and supports HD streaming from apps like Netflix and Prime Videos.

References

Realme mobile phones
Smartphones
Android (operating system) devices
Chinese brands
Mobile phones with multiple rear cameras
Mobile phones introduced in 2019
Mobile phones with 4K video recording
Discontinued smartphones